Mudabidri Venkat Rao Vasudeva Rao ( 1920 – 22 March 2002) was an Indian actor. He entered the film world as a child actor in 1928. He won the Best Actor Award at the 23rd National Film Awards for his role of Choma in the Chomana Dudi (1975), a film based on Shivarama Karanth's novel of the same name.

He played a prominent role in Shyam Benegal's Telugu film Kondura. In Mrinal Sen's Oka Oori Katha and Mani Rathnam's Nayakan, Bombay. He acted in over 200 films in his career; however, post Chomana Dudi, he mostly played minor roles.

Filmography
 Chomana Dudi (1975)
 Oka Oori Katha (1977)
 Kondura (1978)
 Nayakan (1987)
 Bagh Bahadur (1989)
 Bombay (1995)
 Dweepa (2002)

References

External links
 

Indian male film actors
People from Dakshina Kannada district
Tulu people
Best Actor National Film Award winners
2002 deaths
Male actors from Karnataka
20th-century Indian male actors
1920s births